Jahangir Butt (17 April 1943 – 7 September 2021) was a Pakistani field hockey player. He was born in Gujranwala, 
Punjab, British Raj. He won a gold medal at the 1968 Summer Olympics in Mexico City, and a silver medal at the 1972 Summer Olympics in Munich.

Career 
Butt succeeded former Pakistani veteran field hockey player Motiullah as the left winger in the Pakistani side. He was part of the Pakistani side which clinched silver in the men’s field hockey tournament at the 1966 Asian Games and won gold with the national side in the men’s tournament at the 1970 Asian Games.

He represented Pakistan at the Olympics on two occasions in 1968 and 1972 where Pakistan clinched gold and silver respectively in the men's field hockey tournaments. He was also a key member of the national side which emerged victorious at the inaugural edition of the Men’s FIH Hockey World Cup in 1971.

He was replaced by left-out Shahnaz Sheikh in the Pakistan hockey team. However, Jahangir Butt continued playing as a reserve player in the team and the 1972 Munich Olympics was his last international tournament. 

After his retirement from the sport, he went onto become the coach of the Pakistani Junior hockey team. Under his coaching and guidance, Pakistani Junior men’s hockey team secured historic gold at the inaugural edition of the Junior Hockey World Cup in 1979 which was held in France. He also coached the national junior side to bronze medal triumphs at the 1985 Junior Hockey World Cup and 1989 Junior Hockey World Cup. During his tenure as head coach of Pakistani Youth side, Pakistan remained unbeaten on 42 consecutive international matches from 1986 to 1989 and the streak eventually came to an end after a 3- 4 loss to Australia in the semi-final of the 1989 Junior Hockey World Cup. He also served as the head coach of Pakistani national side during the 1996 Summer Olympics, where the Pakistani team placed sixth.

Outside of sports, Butt was affiliated with the Pakistan Custom Department, and retired as Superintendent of Customs.

Honours 
In 1971, the Government of Pakistan awarded Butt with the prestigious Tamgha-e-Imtiaz which is one of the Civil decorations of Pakistan.

Death 
Butt died on 7 September 2021 at the age of 78 due to brief illness and health complications.

References

External links
 

1943 births
2021 deaths
People from Gujranwala
Pakistani male field hockey players
Olympic field hockey players of Pakistan
Olympic gold medalists for Pakistan
Olympic medalists in field hockey
Medalists at the 1968 Summer Olympics
Medalists at the 1972 Summer Olympics
Field hockey players at the 1968 Summer Olympics
Field hockey players at the 1972 Summer Olympics
Asian Games medalists in field hockey
Field hockey players at the 1966 Asian Games
Field hockey players at the 1970 Asian Games
Asian Games gold medalists for Pakistan
Asian Games silver medalists for Pakistan
Pakistani people of Kashmiri descent
Olympic silver medalists for Pakistan
Medalists at the 1966 Asian Games
Medalists at the 1970 Asian Games